Ahkalan (also Romanized as Āhkalān; also known as Āhak Kalān, Āhak Kolān, and Āhak Kūreh) is a village in Howmeh Rural District, in the Central District of Masal County, Gilan Province, Iran. At the 2006 census, its population was 593, in 172 families.

References 

Populated places in Masal County